John James "Jim" Grant  (born January 17, 1936) is a Canadian politician and soldier who served as the 32nd Lieutenant Governor of Nova Scotia.

Early life and education
Born in New Glasgow, Nova Scotia, Grant attended Mount Allison University, graduating in 1956 with a Bachelor of Commerce degree in Accounting and Economics. He is a registered industrial accountant.

Career 
He joined The Pictou Highlanders in 1951 and has served in various leadership positions in the Canadian Forces including as Deputy Commander and Area Commander of the Atlantic Militia Area in 1980, Senior Reserve Advisor to the Commander Force Mobile Command, and as Special Projects Officer on the Chief of Reserves Council at National Defence Headquarters.

He was invested as an Officer in the Order of Military Merit in 1979 and a Commander in the Order in 1988 and has been awarded the Canadian Forces Decoration with three clasps. Grant retired from military service in 1989. 
 
He has been a Governor of the Nova Scotia Division of the Canadian Corps of Commissionaires since 1986, serving as Vice Chair and Chairman of numerous committees. He has also served on the National Board, on committees of the National Board and as a member of the National Executive. He completed 25 years of service with the Board in January 2011.

Grant was appointed the Lieutenant Governor of Nova Scotia on February 16, 2012 by Governor General of Canada David Johnston on the advice of then-Prime Minister, Stephen Harper. He was succeeded by Arthur LeBlanc on June 28, 2017.

On December 27, 2019, it was announced that Grant had been appointed as a member of the Order of Canada.

Honours and medals

Grant's personal decorations include the following:

References

1936 births
Canadian generals
Canadian military personnel from Nova Scotia
Lieutenant Governors of Nova Scotia
Living people
People from New Glasgow, Nova Scotia
21st-century Canadian politicians
Mount Allison University alumni